The Central New Jersey League was a minor league baseball league that played in 1891 and 1892. The n Independent level Central New Jersey League member teams were based exclusively in New Jersey.

Baseball Hall of Fame member Willie Keeler played in the 1891 and 1892 league seasons as a member of the Plainfield Crescent Cities, leading the 1891 league in hitting.

History
The Central New Jersey League was formed for the 1891 season as an Independent level minor league. The exact teams, records and statistics of the 1891 season are unknown.

Baseball Hall of Fame member Willie Keeler played as a member of the 1891 Plainfield team and led the team to the championship. It was reported Keeler hit .376 to lead the league while making $60.00 per month.

The Central New Jersey League continued play in the 1892 season, as an Independent level league with four teams beginning league play on May 26, 1892. The Elizabeth team from Elizabeth, New Jersey, the Plainfield Crescent Cities from Plainfield, New Jersey, Somerville West Ends from Somerville, New Jersey and Westfield Athletics from Westfield, New Jersey were the 1892 league members.

The season concluded on September 24, 1892, with the Plainfield Crescent Cities and Somerville West Ends in a tie for first place with both holding 12–6 records. The Elizabeth and Westfield franchises both disbanded on September 3, 1892. Plainfield disbanded before the playoff against Somerville could be played. Elizabeth and the Westfield Athletics were tied with 5–11 records when the franchises disbanded.

Willie Keeler continued play as a member of the 1892 Plainfield Crescent Cities. At age 20, Keeler left the Plainfield team in June to join Birmingham of the Eastern League before making his major league debut later in the 1892 season. Keeler debuted with the New York Giants on September 30, 1892 at the Polo Grounds.

The Central New Jersey League permanently folded as a minor league following the 1892 season. A 1911 league playing as the "Central New Jersey League" had Plainfield and Somerville as members. Likely, this league was a semi–pro league.

Central New Jersey League teams

Year-by-year standings

1891 Central New Jersey League standings
The complete 1891 league standings are unknown. It was reported the Plainfield Crescents won the 1891 Championship.

1892 Central New Jersey League standings

Notable league alumni

Baseball Hall of Fame alumni
Willie Keeler (1891-1892), Plainfield. Inducted, 1939

Notable alumni
Dude Esterbrook (1892), Westifled
Jack Farrell (1892), Somerville
Jocko Fields (1892), Somerville
George Gore (1892), Somerville
Charlie Jones (1892), Elizabeth
Jack Sharrott (1892), Somerville/Westifled
Tuck Turner (1892), Plainfield
Bob Murphy (1892), Plainfield
Willie Murphy (1892), Plainfield

References

Defunct minor baseball leagues in the United States
Baseball leagues in New Jersey
Sports leagues established in 1891
Sports leagues disestablished in 1892
1892 disestablishments in New Jersey